Mount Dabajian (Atayal: Papak waqa, Saisiyat: Kapatalayan) is located in the northern section of the Shei-Pa National Park in Hsinchu County, Taiwan. It is surrounded by numerous other peaks, the most predominant including Mount Nanhu, Mount Yize, Central Range Point, Mt. Pintian, and Mt. Mutule. It is also near the Madala River.

History
First ascent of the mountain was made in 1927.

Ladders were installed to make summited the challenging peak easier, these were removed in 1991 and summiting the peak is now forbidden.

Geology

Terrain 
The first half of Dabajian Mountain is a medium grade hill with about a 35° incline. The top half is an almost vertical rock face. The mountain's steep grade and unique features were mainly formed by wind. The mountain is composed mainly of greywacke.

See also
 List of mountains in Taiwan

References

Landforms of Hsinchu County
Dabajian
Tourist attractions in Hsinchu County
Mountaineering in Taiwan